Spacious千居 is an online residential real estate marketplace, connecting buyers and tenants with residential and commercial properties throughout Asia. Spacious was founded in 2013 by Asif Ghafoor, former Goldman Sachs and Standard Chartered Bank development manager, senior IT director and application architect, and was part of Hong Kong Science and Technology Parks Corporation incubator program.  Spacious is headquartered in Hong Kong.

Company history

Inception
Spacious was founded by Asif Ghafoor. As of 2015, the website includes rental listings, service apartments and apartments for sale in Hong Kong, a haunted house database and an affordability feature, where users can search for apartments based on their monthly income.

Funding
The company raised a $500K seed round in early 2014 and received $3 million in June, 2015.

References

External links

Real estate websites
Real estate companies established in 2013
Online real estate databases
Real estate companies of Hong Kong
Software companies of Hong Kong
Chinese real estate websites